Chris Hawkes is a songwriter, singer, guitarist, recording engineer and producer. Hawkes performs with Miranda Dawn as the duo Dawn and Hawkes.

Music career

Beginnings and Bands
As a musician Chris Hawkes was first recorded and released on a 1998 compilation Garage Nights at Laser Trax released on Cannon Riggle Records.

Hawkes formed a band called Redtag while attending the University of North Texas.

Hawkes switched roles of frontman/songwriter to produce and play lead guitar for Five Times August, a previously solo project of singer-songwriter Brad Skistimas. The single "Better With You" was featured on MTV series Laguna Beach: The Real Orange County in its inaugural season.

A full length 2005 follow up album Fry Street, with performance and production by Hawkes, received more play on cable and broadcast television. In 2007 tracks from Something Clever and Fry Street were compiled and released as The Independent.

In 2005 Hawkes and other members, also known as Redtag, departed Five Times August and renamed as The Color Gray releasing 2005's self-titled EP and 2006 Control LP. The release of The Color Gray's full-length album Control was preceded with the single "Nothing to Lose" released to commercial rock radio KTBZ-FM, KLAQ, KNCN, KEYJ and playlist rotation on KDGE The Edge Dallas.

Solo career
In 2007 Chris Hawkes released his first solo acoustic album Guitar and Voice
MTV featured "Falling Into Doubt" on episodes of the television series The Hills third and fourth season  and on Animal Planet show Jockey's in 2008.

Hawkes released a second independent album Because I Feel That Way Too
in 2009. Tracks from the album were pre-loaded in AT&T smart phones, featured on MTV's Teen Mom 2 and radio stations in the U.S.

While touring in 2010, Hawkes co-wrote and recorded "Mystery" with Annemarie Jensen releasing the song on her debut album, Melodies and his third album, Broken Record. Shortly after its release, "Mystery" was added to rotation on Danish radio station DR P4. Texas Music magazine featured another track from Broken Record, "From Love (Momma Song)", in their winter 2012 issue, while the title track "Broken Record" was included on MTV series Teen Mom 2 and "Watch It Fall" and "Little Too Long" were featured in 90210.

Dawn and Hawkes
In 2011, Miranda Dawn and Hawkes collaborated for the recording of Dawn's debut album, Reason to Feel Alive.

Dawn was recognized as a finalist in the Kerrville Folk Festival New Folk songwriting competition for her songs "Forever Happily" and "Made to Roam" and performed with Hawkes at the festival in May 2012. Dawn and Hawkes continued co-writing and touring together and released a collaborative effort, Golden Heart, in June 2012.

In 2013, the duo auditioned for season 6 of the American reality talent show The Voice. Their audition was broadcast on NBC on February 24, 2014. Adam Levine and Shakira pressed the "I Want You" button, turning their chairs.

Their iTunes single for "I've Just Seen A Face" charted No. 1 in iTunes Rock sales and No. 22 across all genres, selling 24,000 copies in the first week as a Billboard charts "Hot Shot Debut". Their previously-released "Golden Heart" EP followed.

Dawn and Hawkes toured throughout 2014 including Levitt Pavilion in Arlington, Texas to capacity crowd, California tour and appearances on Season 7 of The Voice supporting their friend Luke Wade's audition, harmony vocals with Jimmy LaFave on Looking Into You: A Tribute to Jackson Browne, summer tour with Austin, TX singer-songwriter Bob Schneider, performances at Bass Performance Hall in Fort Worth, Texas, Austin City Limits soundstage at Moody Theater, Austin City Limits Music Festival, and performances with Chris Isaak, Patty Griffin, Jim Lauderdale, Robert Earl Keen, Hayes Carll and former host of The Tonight Show, Jay Leno.

The duo continued touring throughout 2015 with appearances at music festivals like Folk Alliance International and South by Southwest while recording their first full-length album Yours and Mine.

Dawn and Hawkes announced their marriage with the release of their new music video and single, "Yours and Mine", on August 21, 2015, via Huffington Post. Their full-length album, also titled Yours and Mine, went on sale October 2 and followed with a second video release "Almost Mine" from Texas Monthly, and third video for "Silver Line" from Acoustic Guitar.

Miranda Dawn and Chris Hawkes recorded music and vocals for Daytime Emmy Award winning 2016 StoryBots series Ask The Story Bots and StoryBots Super Songs

Dawn and Hawkes appeared, individually and together, in the 2017 documentary film, Albert E. Brumley: Songwriter of the Ozarks

The duo stored their possessions and lived on the road full-time while starting their second full-length album The Other Side, released July 6, 2018. The first video from the album, 'Trees' premiered on Billboard.

Recording and producing career
Hawkes studied audio engineering at the Dallas Sound Lab in Las Colinas, interned with Grammy Award winning producer Eric Delegard and became an engineer for the University of North Texas College of Music.

In 2004, Hawkes established One Road Studio, for the recording and production of his own bands and other regional acts. In 2006 Hawkes partnered with Disclive, a Dallas-based recording company, to record live performances of Thirty Seconds to Mars, Flyleaf, The Toadies, Sonic Youth, Cooder Graw, Spoonfed Tribe, and Edgewater.

Discography

Albums

Singles
 "I've Just Seen A Face" (2014 Republic Records) No. 13 Rock Digital Singles No. 22 Bubbling Under Hot 100 Singles
 "Stuck in the Middle with You" (2014 Republic Records)

Produced / Engineered / Mixed Albums / EPs

Filmography

References

External links
Chris Hawkes Official Website
One Road Studio Official site 
Dawn and Hawkes Official website
Chris Hawkes YouTube Channel

Record producers from Texas
American rock singers
American rock guitarists
American male guitarists
University of North Texas alumni
Musicians from Austin, Texas
The Voice (franchise) contestants
1982 births
Living people
Guitarists from Texas
21st-century American singers
21st-century American guitarists
21st-century American male singers